Phaeosphecia is a monotypic moth genus in the subfamily Arctiinae erected by George Hampson in 1856. Its single species, Phaeosphecia opaca, described by Francis Walker in 1856, is found in Pará, Brazil.

References

Arctiinae